Anjo Mau (English: Evil Angel)  is a remake of the original 1976 Brazilian telenovela that was produced and broadcast by TV Globo between September 8, 1997, and March 27, 1998. It was produced in 173 chapters.

Glória Pires, Kadu Moliterno, Alessandra Negrini, Leonardo Brício, Maria Padilha, Daniel Dantas, Mauro Mendonça and Gabriel Braga Nunes appear in the leading roles.

Synopsis 

Nice, the main character in the story, is a young woman who is unstoppable. She and her father Augusto are employed in the mansion of the Medeiros, a wealthy and traditional family. She has just one goal in her mind – to marry Rodrigo Medeiros, the eldest son of the family, and brother of her mistress, Stela. The ambitious Nice does everything to conquer him, until she eventually falls in love with him. However, she suffers for her evil deeds and repents.

With an angelic face but a devilish attitude, Nice is dissatisfied with her predictable fate – marrying her boyfriend Julio, living in a cramped rented house in the poor side of the city, having many children, and being a stay-at-home woman. She doesn't want all of this, as her biggest goal in life is to be powerful and to look down upon people.

Nice tries to get closer to Rodrigo. He is about to marry Paula, but she finds out through a babysitter that the bride is going to betray him with his own brother, Ricardo. Disillusioned and willing to challenge his family and their pride, Rodrigo begins to approach the nanny and eventually shows up on São Paulo's nightlife in the company of Nice. She feels powerful because they go to fancy places frequented by celebrities. She makes friends with him, pretending to feel sorry for the heartbreak he suffered, and so as a friend she is worried she will likely win, but the path is not yet fully open to Nice.

Over time, Rodrigo is enchanted with the sweet Wendy, a girl that Bindisi, a shy boy is passionate about, and the nurse uses his own brother, Luis Carlos, to separate them two. Once again Rodrigo thinks he was betrayed and disappointed completely by women. Then there comes Nice again for him as a best friend whom he can trust, a pure staging and so he sees that she is a different woman, and perhaps the love for what he is and not by what he has, a big mistake.

While struggling to win in the mansion of Rodrigo Medeiros, Nice has living hell at home: She is the adopted daughter of Augustus and Alzira. The father loves his daughter as his own, but Alzira, the mother, nurtures a strange hatred for Nice and hides a secret past involving adoption. Nice's mother lives bedeviling the playing pests, humiliates, sends her away from home and often attacks her. Living in this environment since it was adopted created chances to become a nice woman outraged and angry life.

Possibly Nice is the daughter of Augustus with his mistress, and who has raised Alzira, so the two decided to tell her adoptive parents who was Alzira but never forgave the betrayal of her husband and that they have not been forced to raise the fruit of this treachery, as she can not have children, or stay with Nice and stay married or separated from her husband. Afraid of losing him, the girl agreeds to raise her. Nice's mother possibly died at birth or abandoned the newborn with Augustus. This may explain the terrible fact of a mother just hate her own daughter.

In addition to the central plot, racial prejudice ruled out the simple-minded daughter of Teresa Cida: To keep the marriage a millionaire with the bad character Ruy Novaes, Teresa says that her mother has died fearing that her husband would find out that she is black. But Bruno, the son of Teresa and Randy, starts dating Vivian, Cida's stepdaughter, forcing Teresa to dig up his past, to his utter despair, as black she is discriminated she fears losing her husband and be humiliated.

The decline of the traditional São Paulo family is also focused on four hundred years of history, through the sisters Clotilde and Elisinha Ferraz, trying to hide the ruin by keeping the pose.

This telenovela also shows the struggle that Goreti, the dressmaker, has to educate her daughter Simone. Goreti was abandoned in the past by the man who got her pregnant, whom she had loved deeply, but he had only used it against her. She and her daughter face many difficulties. Simone is not ready to forgive her father. He is Thaddeus, the jealous husband of Stela Medeiros who, filled with remorse, tries to approach his teenage daughter but she doesn't want to see him. This results in many fights between them two throughout the story. Simone prefers to be with her poor mother than with her rich father.

The Medeiros family goes bankrupt. Nice continues to dominate and manipulate everyone in the house until she despairs and finds herself in love with Rodrigo.

Cast 
 in order of opening of the novela

Medeiros family

Novaes family

Alzira Machado family

Jordão Ferraz family

Garcia family

Noronha family

Furtado family

And more

Twins

Presenting

External links

1997 Brazilian television series debuts
1997 telenovelas
TV Globo telenovelas
1998 Brazilian television series endings
Brazilian telenovelas
Portuguese-language telenovelas
Nannies in fiction